is a track and field sprint athlete who competes internationally for Japan. She is the Japanese record holder in the women's 100 metres and 200 metres.

Career
She began her career with appearances in the sprints at the 2005 World Youth Championships in Athletics and the 2006 World Junior Championships in Athletics. Fukushima represented Japan at the 2008 Summer Olympics in Beijing, and the 2012 Summer Games in London. She competed at the 100 m sprint and placed fifth in her heat without advancing to the second round. She ran the distance in a time of 11.74 seconds.

In 2009, she broke Sakie Nobuoka's 200 m Japanese national record of 23.33 seconds in Hiroshima, recording 23.14 seconds. Soon after, she broke the national record in the 100 m for the first time, registering 11.28, then 11.24 seconds. She also broke the 200 metres Japanese record again with a run of 23.14 seconds. Fukushima improved upon this in June at the Japanese national championships, winning the race in 23 seconds flat. In addition, this achieved the A standard, and qualification, for the 2009 World Championships in Athletics. However, at the championships she finished fourth in the 200 m heats and was eliminated. She managed to reach the quarter-finals of the 100 m however.

In November of the same year, she won her first Asian title in 100 m with 11.27 seconds into a negative wind of −1.0 m/s, at the 2009 Asian Championships in Athletics in Guangzhou, China. Three days later, she secured her second gold medal of the same meet together with her teammates in the women's 4 x 100 m relay final. She came third for the 2009 Japanese Athlete of the Year award by voting of an expert panel from Track and Field Magazine of Japan.

She began 2010 with a new record in the 100 m at the Mikio Oda Memorial International Amateur Athletic Game, recording a time of 11.21 seconds. She won the 100 m at the Japanese championships, beating Momoko Takahashi in a time of 11.39 seconds, but finished as runner-up behind her rival in the 200 m race. On November 22, she won her first gold medal in 100 m at the 2010 Asian Games, again in Guangzhou, thus ending Japan's 44-year-long medal drought in the sprint event.

At the 2011 Seiko Golden Grand Prix Fukushima set a new national relay record of 43.39 seconds alongside Saori Kitakaze, Momoko Takahashi and Kana Ichikawa.

On June 26, 2011, Chisato Fukushima ran a 100m time of 11.16 with ＋3.4 m/s wind in Tottori city, Japan.

In 2015, she won a gold medal at the Asian Athletics Championships.

Fukushima finally broke her own national record in the 200 meters when she clocked 22.88 seconds at the 100th Japan National Championships on June 26, 2016 in Nagoya, giving her a sixth straight title and earning her a berth at the Rio de Janeiro Olympics. Fukushima’s time at Paloma Mizuho Stadium, cut 0.01 second off the previous record she set back on May 3, 2010, and marked the first time she had broken 23 seconds since then.

On January 20, 2017, Chisato Fukushima said in a statement, "I left Hokkaido College of High Technology and its Athletes Club today. And I decided to become the professional, starting from today".

On January 11, 2018, Chisato Fukushima said at a news conference at Seiko’s headquarters in Tokyo, “I am very pleased that I joined Seiko. I concentrate on practice in a new environment, first of all I would like to aim for updating my self-record Japanese records.".

Competition record

Personal bests

 All information taken from IAAF profile.

References

External links
 
 
 
 

1988 births
Living people
Sportspeople from Hokkaido
Japanese female sprinters
Olympic athletes of Japan
Athletes (track and field) at the 2008 Summer Olympics
Athletes (track and field) at the 2012 Summer Olympics
Athletes (track and field) at the 2016 Summer Olympics
Asian Games gold medalists for Japan
Asian Games silver medalists for Japan
Asian Games bronze medalists for Japan
Asian Games gold medalists in athletics (track and field)
Asian Games medalists in athletics (track and field)
Athletes (track and field) at the 2010 Asian Games
Athletes (track and field) at the 2014 Asian Games
Athletes (track and field) at the 2018 Asian Games
Medalists at the 2010 Asian Games
Medalists at the 2014 Asian Games
World Athletics Championships athletes for Japan
Japan Championships in Athletics winners
Olympic female sprinters
20th-century Japanese women
21st-century Japanese women